Eeyou Istchee
is a territory equivalent to a regional county municipality (TE) of Quebec that is represented by the Grand Council of the Crees.

The total population of the area was 14,131 in 2006, according to the 2006 Canadian Census, and the largest municipality is the Cree village municipality of Chisasibi on the south bank of La Grande River near the northeast shore of James Bay.

Eeyou Istchee TE was created on November 30, 2007. While most of Eeyou Istchee is enclaved within  TE, the Cree reserved land (TC) and Cree village municipality (VC) of Whapmagoostui lie north of the 55th parallel north and are enclaved within Kativik TE.

Communities

The TE of Eeyou Istchee is governed by the Grand Council of the Crees by the Cree Nation Government. It consists of the following municipal units:

 the Cree reserved lands listed above (with code = TC, terre réservée crie):
 the Cree village municipalities listed above (with code VC, municipalité de village cri)

Somewhat confusingly, the Commission de toponymie du Québec refers to the Cree reserved lands as "Cree villages" (village cri), as distinct from the "Cree village municipalities" (municipalité de village cri).  However, from a practical point of view this makes sense, since the population resides in these reserved lands.

Definitions
The above map indicates the Category I lands reserved for the Cree under the terms of the James Bay and Northern Quebec Agreement. Though formally designated as a TE for these areas in 2007, the term "Eeyou Istchee" has long been applied by Quebec Cree to refer to themselves and all their traditional hunting lands. In Category II lands, owned by the Crown-in-right-of-Quebec, hunting, fishing and trapping rights are reserved for the Cree, while forestry, mining and tourism development authority is shared. In Category III lands, some specific hunting and harvesting rights are reserved for the Cree, but all other rights are shared subject to a joint regulatory scheme. Roughly 14,000 km2 fall into Category I, 150,000 km2 in Category II, and 908,000 km2 - almost 60 percent all land in Quebec - are in Category III.

Notes

References

Sources
 Database of the geographical code of Quebec
  Regional maps of municipal and RCM/TE boundaries from the Ministère des Affaires municipales et des Régions. As of January 2008, the Nord-du-Québec map shows Jamésie territory as it was before the creation of Eeyou Istchee.

External links

 Grand Council of the Crees (Eeyou Istchee) official website
 « Eeyou Istchee » : terres des Cris, Archives de Radio-Canada
 Eeyou Istchee Tourism site

 
Territories equivalent to a regional county municipality
Cree reserves and territories
2007 establishments in Quebec
States and territories established in 2007
Enclaves and exclaves